Guyencourt-Saulcourt is a commune in the Somme department in Hauts-de-France in northern France.

Geography

Population

See also
Communes of the Somme department
Saulcourt Churchyard Extension

References

Communes of Somme (department)